Mandapeta Mandal is one of the 22 mandals in Konaseema district of Andhra Pradesh. As per census 2011, there are 1 town and 13 villages.

Demographics 
Mandapeta Mandal has total population of 132,679 as per the Census 2011 out of which 65,724 are males while 66,955 are females and the Average Sex Ratio of Mandapeta Mandal is 1,019. The total literacy rate of Mandapeta Mandal is 72.52%. The male literacy rate is 67.65% and the female literacy rate is 63.11%.

Towns and villages

Towns 
Mandapeta (Municipality)

Villages 
Arthamuru
Chinadevarapudi
Dwarapudi
Ippanapadu
Kesavaram
Maredubaka
Meruipadu
Palathodu
Tapeswaram
Velagathodu
Vemulapalle @ Seetayyapalem
Yeditha	Mandapeta
Z.Medapadu

See also 
List of mandals in Andhra Pradesh

References 

Mandals in Konaseema district
Mandals in Andhra Pradesh